Sawtooth Ridge is an  mountain ridge located in Lewis and Clark County, Montana.

Description

Sawtooth Ridge is located along the Rocky Mountain Front, which is a subset of the Rocky Mountains. It is situated 45 miles west of Great Falls, in the Sun River Wildlife Management Area. Precipitation runoff from this landform drains into tributaries of the Sun River. Castle Reef is 6.94 miles to the north, but Fairview Mountain is considered to be the nearest higher neighbor, 6.57 miles to the south-southwest.

Geology

Sawtooth Ridge is composed of sedimentary rock laid down during the Precambrian to Jurassic periods. Formed in shallow seas, this sedimentary rock was pushed east and over the top of younger rock during the Laramide orogeny.

Climate

Based on the Köppen climate classification, Sawtooth Ridge has an alpine subarctic climate characterized by long, usually very cold winters, and mild to warm summers. Winter temperatures can drop below −10 °F with wind chill factors below −30 °F.

See also
 Geology of the Rocky Mountains

References

External links
 Weather: Sawtooth Ridge

Mountains of Montana
North American 2000 m summits
Landforms of Lewis and Clark County, Montana